Markus Nikolaus Andreas Bockmuehl (born 1961) is a biblical scholar specialising in Early Christianity. He has been the Dean Ireland's Professor of the Exegesis of Holy Scripture at the University of Oxford since 2014, and a Fellow of Keble College, Oxford, since 2007.

Biography 
Bockmuehl previously taught at Regent College, University of British Columbia, at the University of Cambridge, and at the University of St Andrews.

Bockmuehl's late father, Klaus, was Professor of Theology and Ethics at Regent College in Vancouver, Canada.

Works

Thesis

Books
 - based on revised PhD thesis

 - republication by new publisher

Chapters

Articles

References

External links
 Oxford University profile

1961 births
Living people
Academics of the University of Cambridge
Academics of the University of St Andrews
Alumni of the University of Cambridge
Dean Ireland's Professors of the Exegesis of Holy Scripture
Fellows of Fitzwilliam College, Cambridge
Fellows of Keble College, Oxford
University of British Columbia alumni
Regent College alumni